Disney Princess, also called the Princess Line, is a media franchise and toy line owned by the Walt Disney Company. Created by Disney Consumer Products chairman Andy Mooney, the franchise features a lineup of female protagonists who have appeared in various Disney franchises.

The franchise does not include all princess characters from the whole of Disney-owned media, but rather refers to select specific characters from the company's animated films, including protagonists of animated films from Walt Disney Pictures, with 11 characters from the Walt Disney Animation Studios films and one character from a Pixar film. The characters in the franchise consist of Snow White, Cinderella, Aurora, Ariel, Belle, Jasmine, Pocahontas, Mulan, Tiana, Rapunzel, Merida, and Moana.

The franchise has released dolls, sing-along videos, apparel, beauty products, home decor, toys, and a variety of other products featuring some of the Disney Princesses. Licensees for the franchise include Glidden (wall paint), Stride Rite (sparkly shoes), Fisher-Price (plastic figurines), Lego (Lego sets), Mattel and Hasbro (games and dolls).

History

Conception

Former Nike, Inc. executive Andy Mooney was appointed president of The Walt Disney Company's Disney Consumer Products division in December 1999. While attending his first Disney on Ice show, Mooney noticed that several young girls attending the show were dressed in princess attire—though not authentic Disney merchandise. "They were generic princess products they’d appended to a Halloween costume," Mooney told The New York Times. Concerned by this, Mooney addressed the company the following morning and encouraged them to commence work on a legitimate Disney Princess franchise in January 2000. Walt's nephew, Roy E. Disney, objected to the creation of the line, as the company has long "avoided mingling characters from its classic fairy tales in other narratives, worrying that it would weaken the individual mythologies."

The original line-up consisted of princesses Snow White, Cinderella, Tinker Bell, Aurora, Ariel, Belle, Jasmine, Pocahontas, Esmeralda, and Mulan. Tinker Bell was removed soon after; she would go on to headline the sister franchise Disney Fairies. Esmeralda was also removed. This was the first time the characters would be marketed in a separate franchise to their original films. Mooney decided that, when featured on marketing advertisements such as posters, the princesses should never make eye contact with each other in an attempt to keep their individual "mythologies" intact. "[Each] stares off in a slightly different direction as if unaware of the others' presence."

In an unconventional manner, Mooney and his team launched the Disney Princess line without utilizing any focus groups and with minimal marketing. By 2001, Disney Consumer Products (DCP) had generated about $300 million, but by 2012, the division had increased revenue to $3 billion, making it the top seller of consumer entertainment products globally. DCP issued princess product licenses to Hasbro for games, Mattel for dolls, and Fisher-Price for plastic figurines in 2000, allowing the franchise to meet the $1 billion mark in revenue in three years.

Expansions

Inductions and coronations

Tiana became the first additional character to the Disney Princess franchise officially on March 14, 2010, taking Tinker Bell's short-lived place as the ninth member. Her "coronation" took place at the Lotte New York Palace Hotel in Midtown Manhattan. Tinker Bell was already heading up another franchise, Disney Fairies, starting in 2005. 

Rapunzel was crowned and inducted into the franchise as the tenth member on October 2, 2011 during "Rapunzel's Royal Celebration," a special event in London. Also attended by the other Princesses plus the Fairy Godmother and Flynn Rider, it included a procession through Hyde Park concluding with a ceremony at Kensington Palace in the Royal Borough of Kensington and Chelsea, a residence used by the Royal Family since the 17th century and whose residents included Diana, Princess of Wales. Disney hosted the event in cooperation with Historic Royal Palaces, a British nonprofit organization that maintains the State Rooms. 

On May 11, 2013, Merida became the first Pixar character as well as the eleventh member to the franchise in a coronation ceremony in front of Cinderella Castle at the Magic Kingdom Park at Walt Disney World.

In March 2019, Moana was added to the line-up as the twelfth member in the franchise without having a coronation ceremony, but rather being included in future merchandise.

In August 2022, it was announced that Raya from Raya and the Last Dragon would have been inducted as the thirteenth member in the franchise during World Princess Week at Disneyland Paris.

Redesigns, merchandise and other events
A line of Disney Fairy Tale Wedding gowns were designed by Kirstie Kelly, based on the Princesses and available in January 2008.

In 2012, the princesses were given modern redesigns. While some like Tiana and Rapunzel just had added glitter on their outfits, others like Belle and Jasmine received new hairstyles and modified outfits. The most drastic of these was Cinderella, who was given side-swept bangs and an outfit with sheer sleeves.

With Target Corporation as its marketing partner, Disney held the first National Princess Week the week of April 23, 2012. During the week, there was the release of The Princess Diaries on Blu-ray and The Very Fairy Princess book. Harrods, already having a Disney Store within, followed with their Christmas theme being Disney Princess by having Oscar de la Renta designed dress for the Princess on display. In August, the dress were on display at D23 Expo before being auctioned on November 13 to benefit Great Ormond Street Hospital Children's Charity.
	 
Mattel added a Barbie princess-themed line in late 2010 and the fairy tale based Ever After High in 2013. With these competing lines and an expiration of the brand license at the end of 2015, Disney offered Hasbro a chance to gain the license given their work on Star Wars, which led to a Descendants license. DCP was also attempting to evolve the brand by marketing them less as damsels and more as heroines. In September 2014, Disney announced that Hasbro would be the licensed doll maker for the Disney Princess line starting on January 1, 2016.

The June 2013 release of the Disney Princess Palace Pets app from Disney Publishing, led DCP to turn Palace Pets into a Disney Princess franchise extension, with the release of the Palace Pets toy-line in August from licensee Blip Toys. The line was also selected by TimetoPlayMag.com for its Most Wanted List Holiday 2013. In 2015, Disney Publishing released animated shorts series Whisker Haven Tales with the Palace Pets. The shorts journey to a magical world of Whisker Haven, a secret realm deep in a fairy tale land between the Disney Princess kingdoms.

Disney Consumer Products and Interactive Media launched the Princess Comics line, which was started with Princess Comics graphic novels by Joe Book, in August 2018 at Target with Hasbro figures and Hybrid Promotions apparel. This expansion featured Belle, Jasmine, Ariel, Rapunzel, and Pocahontas.

On April 27, 2021, Disney launched the Ultimate Princess Celebration. This year-long event brought back the princesses' classic designs and included many special events, products, and performances. Despite not being official, Anna and Elsa from the Frozen franchise were included in parts of the celebration; they were removed from their temporary inclusion in the collection at the end of August 2022. When the celebration launched in South Africa on April 29, 2021, Sofia from Sofia the First and Elena from Elena of Avalor were also included for its territory, though in a lesser capacity than the other princesses.

In January 2022, Mattel regained the license to produce lines of toys and dolls for the brand.

Official canon of Disney Princesses

The official canon of Disney Princesses consists of the female protagonists, most of whom have royal ties within their fictional universes, from twelve selected Disney films. They were given an official number in the franchise line-up based on the chronological order in which their films were released, starting with Snow White as the first and original Disney Princess, with Cinderella being the second, followed by Aurora and so on.

Snow White – Snow White and the Seven Dwarfs (1937)
Cinderella – Cinderella (1950)
Aurora – Sleeping Beauty (1959)
Ariel – The Little Mermaid (1989)
Belle – Beauty and the Beast (1991)
Jasmine – Aladdin (1992)
Pocahontas – Pocahontas (1995)
Mulan – Mulan (1998)
Tiana – The Princess and the Frog (2009)
Rapunzel – Tangled (2010)
Merida – Brave (2012)
Moana – Moana (2016)

Former Princesses
Tinker Bell – Peter Pan (1953)
Esmeralda – The Hunchback of Notre Dame (1996)

Meet-and-greets and live events

Disneyland 

Currently, all the princesses are available for meet-and-greets at Disneyland Resort in California. Additionally, in 2006, as part of the "Year of Million Dreams" celebration, the Fantasyland Theater began hosting the Disneyland Princess Fantasy Faire, a show featuring Lords and Ladies that taught young boys and girls the proper etiquette to be a Prince or Princess and featured appearances from the Disney Princesses. In 2010, Rapunzel was given a Tangled meet-and-greet location. The Carnation Plaza Gardens bandstand, adjacent to Sleeping Beauty Castle, was closed to be replaced by a new Fantasy Faire area in the Spring of 2013.

Fantasy Faire 

The Fantasy Faire area at Disneyland officially opened on March 12, 2013, as the permanent home for the Disney Princesses; consisting of a Royal Hall, a Royal Theatre, Maurice's Treats food cart, and a Fairytale Treasures gift shop. The theater features two small shows based on Beauty and the Beast and Tangled. The hall is used for meet and greets with the princesses, which have a rotation schedule with three princesses scheduled to appear at a time.

Walt Disney World 
At Walt Disney World, the princesses are available for meet-and-greets in more specific locations. The Cinderella-based character dining and interaction, located at Cinderella's Royal Table in her Magic Kingdom castle, as well as "Cinderella's Happily Ever After Dinner" (formerly known as the "Cinderella's Gala Feast Dinner") at 1900 Park Fare in Disney's Grand Floridian Resort & Spa are common places for Cinderella and other Disney characters to appear. The Princesses also can be found at the Princess Storybook meal at Epcot in the Norway Pavilion at Akershus Royal Banquet Hall, and several are found in their respective pavilions around the World Showcase, such as Snow White in Germany, Mulan in China, and Belle and Aurora in France. On September 18, 2013, a new meet-and-greet attraction called Princess Fairytale Hall opened at the Magic Kingdom.

Shanghai Disneyland 
A Disney Princess meet-and-greet location called Storybook Court is operational and is located at Enchanted Storybook Castle.

Hong Kong Disneyland 
Hong Kong Disneyland's Castle of Magical Dreams has a meet-and-greet location being The Royal Reception Hall for the Disney Princesses.

Media

Films and television
Princess Party Palace (formerly known as The Princess Power Hour) was a programming block on Toon Disney from 2000 until 2007, where it used to air episodes of The Little Mermaid and Aladdin.

The Disney Princesses' television appearances were compiled into the Disney Princess Collection, a series of compilation VHS cassettes containing episodes from Aladdin and The Little Mermaid as well as two Beauty and the Beast specials. A later DVD series was released, entitled Disney Princess Stories, featuring content similar to the previous release.

Belle had her own live-action television series titled Sing Me a Story with Belle. The first eight Disney Princesses also made appearances on the animated TV series House of Mouse. Cinderella, Belle, and Snow White also made cameo appearances in the TV animated series Mickey Mouse. The television special The Little Mermaid Live! starred Auliʻi Cravalho as Ariel.

In early 2007, Disney announced Disney Princess Enchanted Tales, a new series of direct-to-video features that feature new stories for the Disney Princesses. The first film in the series entitled Disney Princess Enchanted Tales: Follow Your Dreams, was released on September 4, 2007. It is a musical film featuring a new tale about Princess Jasmine and the first new tale about Princess Aurora since the original Sleeping Beauty. Originally, Disney Princess Enchanted Tales: A Kingdom of Kindness was announced as the first film in the series, which contained a different Princess Aurora story, and had a Belle story rather than a Princess Jasmine story. Disney made this change without any sort of notice. The series was cancelled and only Follow Your Dreams exists.

The TV series Once Upon a Time, which aired on the Disney-owned ABC, featured live-action versions of Snow White, Cinderella, Belle, Aurora, Mulan, Ariel, Rapunzel, Merida, Jasmine and Tiana. Snow White and Belle were main characters, while the rest made recurring and/or guest appearances. Beginning in season 7, Cinderella, Tiana and Rapunzel were main characters. Many of these characters are patterned after the Disney versions, but a few draw inspiration from older stories.

The TV series Sofia the First premiered on January 11, 2013, on Disney Junior. Cinderella appeared in the first film, Once Upon A Princess. Jasmine, Belle, Aurora, Snow White, Mulan, Tiana, and Merida have appeared on the show, and Ariel and Rapunzel appeared in the TV specials The Floating Palace and The Curse of Princess Ivy, respectively. However, Sofia is a minor princess and not in the royal court. She is voiced by Modern Family star Ariel Winter. In 2017, the TV series Rapunzel's Tangled Adventure debuted with the television film Tangled: Before Ever After serving as the pilot. In December 2020, it was announced that Tiana and Moana would have spin-off TV shows debuting on Disney+ in 2022 and 2023, respectively.

In the films Maleficent (2014) and Maleficent: Mistress of Evil (2019), Elle Fanning plays Aurora. Lily James portrays Cinderella in the eponymous 2015 film. Emma Watson is seen as Belle in the 2017 film Beauty and the Beast. Naomi Scott stars as Jasmine in the 2019 film Aladdin. Liu Yifei appears as Mulan in the eponymous 2020 film. Halle Bailey has been cast to play Ariel in the upcoming 2023 film The Little Mermaid. Rachel Zegler has been cast to portray the title character in the upcoming 2024 film Snow White.

The Princesses, along with Anna and Elsa, make guest appearances in the 2018 film Ralph Breaks the Internet. This film marks the first direct interaction between the characters in an animated Disney feature. Rich Moore and Phil Johnston, the directors of Ralph Breaks the Internet, said that a film focusing on the Disney Princesses could be made depending on the audience's response and "if there's a good story to be told."

In 2021, Disney Channel began to air shorts in the Chibi Tiny Tales series, a loose follow up to Big Chibi 6 The Shorts, based on the Disney Princess franchise. The first episode, "Moana As Told By Chibi," was released on August 27, 2021.

Literature

Disney Princess Chapter Books
Ariel: The Birthday Surprise
Belle: The Mysterious Message
Cinderella: The Great Mouse Mistake
Tiana: The Grand Opening
Jasmine: The Missing Coin
Aurora: The Perfect Party
Rapunzel: A Day to Remember

A Jewel Story
Ariel: The Shimmering Star Necklace
Cinderella: The Lost Tiara
Belle: The Charming Gift
Jasmine: The Jewel Orchard
Tiana: The Stolen Jewel
Merida: Legend of the Emeralds

Comic adaptation
In Kilala Princess, a Japanese fantasy/romance manga produced by Kodansha that debuted on Nakayoshi in April 2005, a girl named Kilala and her adventures to find her kidnapped friend with the help of the first six Disney Princesses (Snow White, Cinderella, Aurora, Ariel, Belle, and Jasmine). However, Kilala herself is not considered part of the franchise.

On February 24, 2016, a Disney Princesses anthology ongoing comic book's first issue hit the stands. The series is published by Joe Books. Joe Books expanded Disney Princess to a graphic novel line as an exclusive for Target along with a Hasbro figure line and a Hybrid Promotions apparel line.

Video games
Disney Princesses have appeared in various other media, such as video games, including Disney Princess: Enchanted Journey, Disney Princess: Magical Jewels, and Disney Princess: My Fairytale Adventure. Rapunzel can be found as a character in the 2013 game Disney Infinity. Disney Infinity: 2.0 Edition has the addition of Merida and Jasmine. However, Merida is also included with Stitch in the Toy Box Starter Pack. Disney Infinity 3.0 has the addition of Mulan. Merida can be found as a character via Pixar Family Builds in the 2018 Lego game Lego The Incredibles. All Disney Princesses are also playable characters in the mobile game Disney Magic Kingdoms, with Cinderella, Aurora, Pocahontas, and Rapunzel being part of the main storyline, while the rest are limited time characters.

Kingdom Hearts
In the Kingdom Hearts game series, the seven "Princesses of Heart," are young ladies with entirely pure hearts who would open the way to Kingdom Hearts if gathered together. Five of these maidens include the Disney Princesses being Snow White, Cinderella, Aurora, Belle, and Jasmine. The remaining Princesses of Heart are Alice from Alice in Wonderland (despite not being a princess) and game series' heroine, Kairi. While both Ariel and Mulan are not Princesses of Heart, they are instead party members of their respective worlds. The Disney Princesses make various appearances throughout the series:
While Snow White, Cinderella, Aurora, Ariel, Belle, Jasmine, Alice, and Kairi all appear in the first game, only Ariel, Belle, and Jasmine reappeared in Kingdom Hearts II with Kairi, though the others are mentioned. Mulan, however, makes her first appearance as the player visits her world. She serves as a tradeable character in the party similarly to how Ariel was in the first Kingdom Hearts.
Ariel, Belle, Jasmine, Alice, and Kairi appear in Kingdom Hearts: Chain of Memories as figments of Sora or Riku's memory, but their roles as Princesses of Heart are not brought up.
Belle and Jasmine reappear in Kingdom Hearts 358/2 Days when they each meet Roxas. Wonderland reappears as well, but without Alice.
Snow White, Cinderella, Aurora, and a young Kairi appear in the prequel Kingdom Hearts Birth by Sleep, as the game's playable characters Terra, Aqua, and Ventus assume prominent positions in the princesses' original stories.
Digital versions of Alice and Jasmine appear in Kingdom Hearts Coded.
Kingdom Hearts III introduces the "New Seven Hearts," which is a new set of princesses inheriting the roles from the previous princesses, with Kairi being the only princess from the original seven retaining her role. Rapunzel is the only Disney Princess currently known to be among the New Seven Hearts, while non-members Anna and Elsa from Frozen are also known to be members. 
As of present, Pocahontas, Tiana, Merida, and Moana are the only Disney Princesses who have yet to appear in the series.

Awards and recognition

 Snow White and the Seven Dwarfs (1937; added in 1989)
 Beauty and the Beast (1991; added in 2002) 
 Cinderella (1950; added in 2018) 
 Sleeping Beauty (1959; added in 2019)
 The Little Mermaid (1989; added in 2022)

References

External links

Official website

Disney Princess
Mass media franchises introduced in 2000
Doll brands
Disneyland
Magic Kingdom
Shanghai Disneyland
Hong Kong Disneyland
Disney Consumer Products franchises